The AWK Programming Language is a well-known 1988 book written by Alfred V. Aho, Brian W. Kernighan, and Peter J. Weinberger and published by Addison-Wesley, often referred to as the gray book. The book describes the AWK programming language and is the de facto standard for the language, written by its inventors. W. Richard Stevens, author of several UNIX books including Advanced Programming in the Unix Environment, cites the book as one of his favorite technical books. The book is translated to several languages and is cited by many technical papers in the ACM journals.

According to the book's frontmatter the book was typeset "using an Autologic APS-5 phototypesetter and a DEC VAX 8550 running the 9th Edition of the UNIX operating system".

References

External links 
 The Awk Programming Language book review - IEEE

Computer books
Computer_programming_books
Addison-Wesley books